Triund is a small hill station in the Kangra district in the state of Himachal Pradesh, India. Triund is a part of Dharamkot.

The hike over the Triund is not too difficult and takes roughly a day. It's about 9 kilometers (6.2 miles) long (one way) in the Dharamshala district of Himachal Pradesh, India. Depending on your speed and how often you stop, the journey may be completed in one direction in roughly seven to eight hours. Tourists go there to take in the breathtaking panorama of the Dhauladhar Mountains.

See also 

List of hill stations in India
Dharamshala
McLeodGanj
Kangra district

References 

 Government website
 Triund Trek

Other websites

Villages in Kangra district
Hill stations in Himachal Pradesh
Dharamshala